Canu Heledd (modern Welsh /'kani 'hɛlɛð/, the songs of Heledd) are a collection of early Welsh englyn-poems. They are rare among medieval Welsh poems for being set in the mouth of a female character. One prominent figure in the poems is Heledd's dead brother Cynddylan.

Summary

Dorothy Ann Bray summarised the cycle thus:
The entire cycle of the Heledd poems ... is a statement of mourning from which a background story has been deduced: Cynddylan, prince of Powys, and  his brothers along with his heroic band are slain in battle, defending their country against the English in the mid-seventh century. Heledd, his sister, is one of the few survivors, who witnessed the battle and the destruction of Cynddylan's hall at Pengwern. She has lost not only all her brothers, but also her sisters and her  home, and the poems suggest that she blames herself for the  destruction of Cynddylan's court because of some ill-spoken words.

As with the other so-called 'saga englynion’ (pre-eminently Canu Llywarch Hen and Canu Urien), there is considerable uncertainty and debate as to how the poems of Canu Heledd might originally have been performed. It is usually assumed that they must have been accompanied by some kind of prose narrative, to which they provided emotional depth; but this is not certain.

Contents 

As edited by Jenny Rowland, the contents of Canu Heledd are as follows:

Manuscripts and dating 

The poems are attested principally in the Red Book of Hergest, which was written between about 1382 and 1410. They were also included in the White Book of Rhydderch, but are now lost due to damage to the manuscript. However, they are attested in two later manuscripts descended from the White Book, Peniarth 111 (made by John Jones of Gellillyfdy in 1607), whose spelling is very close to the White Book's, and London, British Library, Add. MS 31055 (made by Thomas Wiliems in 1596), which is a less conservative copy. Some other late copies of lost medieval manuscripts of the englynion also exist: National Library of Wales 4973 contains two copies of the cycle, both copied by Dr John Davies of Mallwyd, one of Wales's leading antiquarians and scribes of his day, before 1631. The first copy, NLW 4973a, derives from a lost manuscript closer to the White Book than the Red. The second copy, NLW 4973b, is more complex and may represent a conflation of multiple medieval sources, but seems to have at least some independent value as a witness to the lost archetype of the poems. It is fairly clear that all these manuscripts descend from a lost common original, to which they are all fairly similar, making the creation of a critical edition of the poems relatively straightforward.

Despite surviving first in manuscripts written between about 1382 and 1410 and in largely Middle Welsh orthography, Canu Heledd are thought mostly to have been composed in Old Welsh and transmitted orally and/or in manuscript, due to their archaic style and occasionally archaic spelling: Jenny Rowland dates the cycle to c. 800-900.

Historicity 

Although neither Cynddylan nor Heledd are attested in historical sources such as the Harleian genealogies, Cynddylan is the subject of a lament in awdl-metre, Marwnad Cynddylan (not to be confused with the englynion of the same title in Canu Heledd), which is thought to date from the time of his death, and scholars have not doubted that Cynddylan and Heledd were historical figures in seventh-century Powys. However, while some scholars have thought of other details of Canu Heledd as also being good evidence for seventh-century events, other sources suggest that seventh-century relations between Mercia and Powys were more cordial, and that there was no catastrophic invasion of Powys by the English in this period. Such invasions did characterise the ninth century, however, when Canu Heledd was probably composed. Thus the poems are generally now thought more to reflect ninth-century imaginings of what the seventh century must have been like, telling us more about ninth-century realities than seventh-century ones. Some commentators even consider a tenth-century date for the origin of the text.

Heledd has been supposed by some commentators to have 'taken over the mantle of the old Celtic goddess of sovereignty', but there is no substantial evidence for this.

Example 
As edited and translated by Jenny Rowland, stanzas 57-65 of Canu Heledd, entitled 'Ffreuer', run:

Appearances in popular culture 

Heledd's reception in post-medieval texts has been surveyed by Marged Haycock. These include the novella Tywyll Heno by Kate Roberts.

Editions and translations 

 Ifor Williams, Canu Llywarch Hen, 2nd edn (Cardiff, 1953)
 Jenny Rowland, Early Welsh Saga Poetry: A Study and Edition of the 'Englynion’ (Cambridge: Brewer, 1990) (includes editions pp. 404–18 and translations pp. 468–76)
 Jenny Rowland, (ed.) A Selection of Early Welsh Saga Poems (London: Modern Humanities Research Association, 2014) (selected texts)

References 

Welsh-language poems